Cezar Andrei Trandafirescu (born 27 January 1998) is a Romanian professional footballer who plays as a midfielder or as a forward.

References

External links
 
 

1998 births
Living people
Footballers from Bucharest
Romanian footballers
Association football midfielders
Association football forwards
Liga I players
FC Dinamo București players
FC Voluntari players